Gościkowo, formerly Paradyż,  is a village in the administrative district of Gmina Świebodzin, within Świebodzin County, Lubusz Voivodeship, in western Poland.

In the 13th century, the village was known as Gościchowo which is the source of the modern name. In 1230 Mikołaj Bronisz (Wieniawa) granted the area to the Cistercians who gave it the Latin name Paradius Matris Dei, from which Paradies and Paradyż were derived.

The village has a population of 380.

References

Villages in Świebodzin County